Shyu Jong-shyong (born 7 October 1957) is a Taiwanese politician. He was the Deputy Secretary-General of the Executive Yuan in 2015–2016.

Education
Shyu obtained his bachelor's degree in political science from Soochow University in 1981. He then continued his studies in the United States and obtained his master's degree in special education and doctorate in physical disability welfare from the University of Northern Colorado.

Early career
After graduation from University of Northern Colorado, Shyu became a specialist under the Department of Social Affairs of Taiwan Provincial Government in 1987–1988. In 1988-1991 he became an associate researcher at the Taiwan Secondary Education Teachers Training Center and in 1991-1993 he became an associate professor at the Department of Special Education of National Taichung Teacher's College.

References

Members of the 2nd Legislative Yuan
Living people
1957 births
Kuomintang Members of the Legislative Yuan in Taiwan
Members of the 3rd Legislative Yuan
Members of the 4th Legislative Yuan
Members of the 5th Legislative Yuan
Members of the 6th Legislative Yuan
Members of the 7th Legislative Yuan
Taichung Members of the Legislative Yuan
University of Northern Colorado alumni
Soochow University (Taiwan) alumni